Eddy Williams (18 September 1915 – 17 January 2008) was an Australian cricketer. He played one first-class cricket match for Victoria in 1936.

See also
 List of Victoria first-class cricketers

References

External links
 

1915 births
2008 deaths
Australian cricketers
Victoria cricketers
Cricketers from Melbourne
Australian Services cricketers